John Dransfield (born 1945) is an honorary research fellow and former head of palm research at the Royal Botanic Gardens, Kew, United Kingdom, as well as being an authority on the phylogenetic classification of palms.

Dransfield has written or contributed to several books on palms, notably both the first and second editions of Genera Palmarum. The first edition was the standard reference for palm evolution and classification and the second edition, expanding on the original, is expected to achieve that same benchmark.

He studied at the University of Cambridge, B.A.(1967) biology, M.A. (1970) botany and Ph.D. biology (1970) before working at Kew Gardens. 

In 2004, Dransfield was awarded the Linnean Medal, an annual award given by the Linnean Society of London.

The genus Dransfieldia was named for him, as was the species Adonidia dransfieldii.

He married Dr Soejatmi Dransfield (née Soejatmi Soenarko) in Malaysia (1977).

Selected works

The typification of Linnean palms. International Bureau for Plant Taxonomy and Nomenclature, 1979.
A manual of the rattans of the Malay Peninsula. By John Dransfield. Forest Dept., Ministry of Primary Industries, Malaysia, 1979.
The rattans of Sabah. By John Dransfield. Forest Dept. Sabah, 1984.
Palmae. By John Dransfield. Published on behalf of the East African Governments by Balkema, 1986.
Genera Palmarum: a classification of palms based on the work of Harold E. Moore, Jr. By Harold E. Moore, Natalie W. Uhl and John Dransfield. L.H. Bailey Hortorium, 1987.
The palms of the New World: a conservation census. By John Dransfield, Dennis Victor Johnson and Hugh Synge. IUCN, 1988.
The rattans of Sarawak. By John Dransfield. Royal Botanic Gardens, Kew, 1992.
The palms of Madagascar. By John Dransfield and Henk Beentje. Royal Botanic Gardens and the International Palm Society, 1995.
Priority species of bamboo and rattan. Edited by A. N. Rao, V. Ramanatha Rao, and J.T. Williams. Bioversity International, 1998.
Corybas west of Wallace's Line. By John Dransfield. Royal Botanic Gardens, Kew, 2000.
World checklist of palms. By Rafaël Govaerts and John Dransfield. Royal Botanic Gardens, Kew, 2005.
Field guide to the palms of Madagascar. By John Dransfield. Royal Botanic Gardens, Kew, 2006.
Field guide to the palms of New Guinea. By William J. Baker and John Dransfield. Royal Botanic Gardens, Kew, 2006.
Genera Palmarum: the evolution and classification of palms. By John Dransfield and Natalie W. Uhl. Kew Pub., 2008. Received the 2009 Annual Literature Award of the Council on Botanical and Horticultural Libraries.
 , in 
Beyond Genera Palmarum: progress and prospects in palm systematics  By William J. Baker & J Dransfield. 2016. Oxford Academy, Botanical Journal of the Linnean Society,2016, 182, 207–233

See also
Harold E. Moore
Natalie Whitford Uhl

References

Bibliography

 

British botanists
1945 births
Linnean Medallists
Place of birth missing (living people)
Living people
20th-century births
Botanists active in Kew Gardens